The Mexican National Mini-Estrella Championship (Campeonato Nacional Mini-Estrella in Spanish), also referred to as the Mexican National Minis Championship, is an inactive professional wrestling championship sanctioned by Comisión de Box y Lucha Libre Mexico D.F. (Mexico City Boxing and Wrestling Commission). While the commission sanctioned the title, it did not promote the events at which the championship was defended. Asistencia Asesoría y Administración (AAA) promoted the events and had the everyday control of the championship. The championship was exclusively for wrestlers in the Mini-Estrellas, or Minis, division. A "Mini" is not necessarily a person with dwarfism, as in North American Midget wrestling; wrestlers who do not have dwarfism but are very short also work in the Mini-Estrellas division. As it was a professional wrestling championship, it was not won legitimately; it was instead won via a scripted ending to a match or awarded to a wrestler because of a storyline. All title matches took place under two out of three falls rules.

The championship was introduced in January 1993, to be used as the top championship in AAA's newly created Mini-Estrella division. Espectrito won a match against Mascarita Sagrada; Mascarita Sagrada had been the CMLL World Mini-Estrellas Champion when Antonio Peña left Consejo Mundial de Lucha Libre (CMLL) to create AAA and was initially offered the championship without a match; Sagrada declined, opting to face Espectrito in a match to decide who would become the first champion instead. In 1995 then-reigning champion Super Muñequito defeated Espectrito to win the IWC World Mini-Estrella Championship, merging it with the Mexican National title. In 1997 then-reigning champion Mascarita Sagrada Jr. left AAA to work for Promo Azteca; he vacated the title and changed his name to "Tzuki". Octagoncito II defeated Pentagoncito to win the vacant title. In 2007, Mascarita Sagrada 2000 left AAA for rival promotion CMLL, while still holding the championship.

AAA replaced the championship with the AAA World Mini-Estrella Championship in 2008. The first Mini-Estrella champion, Espectrito, was one of three wrestlers to hold the championship twice, the others being Octagoncito II and Mascarada Sagrada 2000. There was a total of 15 championship reigns shared by 11 wrestlers. Mascarita Sagrada 2000 has the longest individual championship reign at 958 days, as well the longest combined reigns at 1,867 days. Jerrito Estrada's 26-day reign was the shortest.

Title history

Reigns by combined length

Footnotes

References

Lucha Libre AAA Worldwide championships
Mexican national wrestling championships
Midget wrestling championships
1992 establishments in Mexico
Recurring events established in 1992
National professional wrestling championships